The centrohelids or centroheliozoa are a large group of heliozoan protists.  They include both mobile and sessile forms, found in freshwater and marine environments, especially at some depth.

Characteristics
Individuals are unicellular and spherical, usually around 30–80 μm in diameter, and covered with long radial axopods, narrow cellular projections that capture food and allow mobile forms to move about.

A few genera have no cell covering, but most have a gelatinous coat holding scales and spines, produced in special deposition vesicles.  These may be organic or siliceous and come in various shapes and sizes.  For instance, in Raphidiophrys the coat extends along the bases of the axopods, covering them with curved spicules that give them a pine-treeish look, and in Raphidiocystis there are both short cup-shaped spicules and long tubular spicules that are only a little shorter than the axopods.  Some other common genera include Heterophrys, Actinocystis, and Oxnerella.

The axopods of centrohelids are supported by microtubules in a triangular-hexagonal array, which arise from a tripartite granule called the centroplast at the center of the cell.  Axopods with a similar array occur in gymnosphaerids, which have traditionally been considered centrohelids (though sometimes in a separate order from the others).  This was questioned when it was found they have mitochondria with tubular cristae, as do other heliozoa, while in centrohelids the cristae are flat.  Although this is no longer considered a very reliable character, on balance gymnosphaerids seem to be a separate group.

Classification
The evolutionary position of the centrohelids is not clear.  Structural comparisons with other groups are difficult, in part because no flagella occur among centrohelids, and genetic studies have been more or less inconclusive.  Cavalier-Smith has suggested they may be related to the Rhizaria, but for the most part they are left with uncertain relations to other groups. A 2009 paper suggests that they may be related to the cryptophytes and haptophytes (see Cryptomonads-haptophytes assemblage). They are currently classified as Hacrobia, under the Plants+HC clade, although some research studies have found evidence against the monophyly of this group.
Centrohelids are currently divided into two orders with contrasting scale morphology and ultrastructure: Pterocystida and Acanthocystida.

 Class Centrohelea Kuhn 1926 stat. n. Cavalier-Smith 1993
 Genus Spiculophrys Zlatogursky 2015
 Order Pterocystida Cavalier-Smith 2011
 Family Choanocystidae Cavalier-Smith & von der Heyden 2007
 Genus Choanocystis Penard 1904 non Cognetti 1918
 Family Oxnerellidae Cavalier-Smith & Chao 2012
 Genus Oxnerella Dobell 1917
 Family Heterophryidae Poche 1913
 Genus Heterophrys Archer 1869
 Genus Parasphaerastrum Mikrjukov 1996
 Genus Sphaerastrum Greeff 1873
 Family Pterocystidae Cavalier-Smith & von der Heyden 2007
 Genus Chlamydaster Rainer 1968
 Genus Pterocystis Siemensma & Roijackers 1988 non Lohmann 1904
 Genus Raineriophrys Mikrjukov 2001 [Rainierophrys (sic); Raineria Mikrjukov 1999 non Osswald 1928 non de Notaris 1838; Echinocystis Mikrjukov1997 non Haeckel 1896 non Bhatia & Chatterjee 1925 non Torrey & Gray 1840 non Gregory 1897]
 Order Acanthocystida Cavalier-Smith 2011
 Suborder Marophryina Cavalier-Smith 2011
 Family Marophryidae Cavalier-Smith & von der Heyden 2007
 Genus Marophrys 
 Suborder Chalarothoracina Hertwig & Lesser 1874 stat n. Cavalier-Smith 2011
 Family Raphidiophryidae Mikrjukov 1996 emend. Cavalier-Smith & von der Heyden 2007
 Genus Heteroraphidiophrys Mikrjukov & Patterson 2000
 Genus Polyplacocystis Mikrjukov 1996
 Genus Pseudoraphidiophrys Mikrjukov 1997
 Genus Raphidiophrys Archer 1867 [Raphidiaphrys (sic) Greeff 1869]
 Family Acanthocystidae Claus 1874 emend. Cavalier-Smith & von der Heyden 2007
 Genus Raphidocystis Penard 1904 [Raphidiocystis (sic) Doflein 1928 ; Rhaphidocystis (sic)]
 Genus Pseudoraphidocystis Mikrjukov 1997 [Pseudoraphidiocystis (sic)]
 Genus Acanthocystis Carter 1863 non Kuehner 1926 non Bather 1889 non Haeckel 1896 nomen nudum

References

Further reading 

 

Haptista
Amoeboids
Bikont classes